Big City is a shopping mall in East District, Hsinchu, Taiwan that opened on April 28, 2012. It is owned and operated by Far Eastern Group. Since 2015, it has set a record of 10 billion NT$ of sales within three and a half years of operation, and has squeezed into Taiwan's top eight shopping malls in terms of sales revenue. In the first half of 2017, the number of Facebook check-ins was ranked second in Taiwan, with 2.5 million times second only to Taiwan Taoyuan International Airport. In 2019, its revenue reached NT$12.3 billion, making it the top 7 shopping malls in Taiwan in terms of sales revenue. Main core stores of the mall include A.mart, citysuper, Daiso, Eslite Bookstore, H&M, Muji, Sisley, Starbucks, Vieshow Cinemas and various themed restaurants. In October 2021, the third authorized Lego store in Taiwan opened in the mall.

Gallery

See also
 List of tourist attractions in Taiwan
 Mega City (shopping mall)
 Top City
 Taroko Square

References

External links

Big City Shopping Mall Official Website

2012 establishments in Taiwan
Shopping malls in Hsinchu City
Shopping malls established in 2012